War and Peace: 1796–1815 is a video game released in 2002. It was developed by Microïds for Microsoft Windows based PCs.

The game is fully modeled in 3D and there are 183 towns to capture during the game. There are six playable nations, and 30 non-playable neutral nations.

References

External links 
 War and Peace: 1796–1815 at Microïds

Windows games
Windows-only games
2002 video games
Microïds games
Strategy video games
Video games scored by Inon Zur
Video games developed in France
Video games set in the 18th century
Video games set in the 19th century
World conquest video games